The 2006 Arizona Wildcats baseball team represented the University of Arizona during the 2006 NCAA Division I baseball season. The Wildcats played their home games at Jerry Kindall Field at Frank Sancet Stadium. The team was coached by Andy Lopez in his 5th season at Arizona. The Wildcats finished with a record of 27-28 (12-12 Conf.) They failed to make the postseason for only the 2nd season under Lopez. This would also mark one of only 2 losing seasons Arizona would have under Lopez.

Previous season 
The Wildcats finished the 2005 season with a record of 39-21 (17-7 Conf.), advancing to the postseason for the 3rd straight year. They advanced to the Fullerton Regional final where they would lose to host Cal State Fullerton.

Personnel

Roster

Coaches

Opening day

Schedule and results

2006 MLB Draft

References 

Arizona
Arizona Wildcats baseball seasons
Arizona baseball